Henry Little may refer to:

Henry F. W. Little, sergeant in the Union Army and Medal of Honor recipient in the American Civil War
Henry Little (jockey) in Prince of Wales Stakes

See also
Harry Little (disambiguation)